

 
Creswell is a locality in the Northern Territory of Australia located in the territory's east adjoining the border with the state of Queensland  about  south-east of the territory capital of Darwin.

The locality consists of the following land (from west to east, then north to south):
Eva Springs pastoral lease,
Anthony Lagoon pastoral lease, 
Mallapunyah Springs and Walhallow pastoral leases,
Cresswell Downs pastoral lease and,
Benmara pastoral lease.

The locality's boundaries and name were gazetted on 4 April 2007.  Its name is derived from the Creswell pastoral lease and ultimately from Cresswell Creek named by the explorer, Ernest Favenc.

The 2016 Australian census which was conducted in August 2016 reports that Creswell had a population of 45.

Creswell is located within the federal division of Lingiari, the territory electoral division of Barkly and the local government area of the Barkly Region.

References

Notes

Sources

Populated places in the Northern Territory
Barkly Region